Guru Ghasidas Vishwavidyalaya is a central university located in Bilaspur, Chhattisgarh, India. It is one of the largest and oldest institution of higher education of Chhattisgarh. Established under Central Universities Act 2009, No. 25 of 2009.

Formerly known as Guru Ghasidas University (GGU), established by an Act of the State Legislative Assembly, was formally inaugurated on June 16, 1983. GGV is an active member of the Association of Indian Universities and Association of Commonwealth Universities. The National Assessment & Accreditation Council (NAAC) has accredited the University as B+. The university is named after the Satnami Guru Ghasidas.

History
Guru Ghasidas Vishwavidyalaya established as 9th state university of undivided Madhya Pradesh on 16 June 1983 by an Act of the State Legislative Assembly. The university is named to honor the great Satnami Saint Guru Ghasidas (1756–1850), who championed the cause of the downtrodden and waged a relentless struggle against all forms of social evils and injustice prevailing in the society.
GGU upgraded into a Central University under Central Universities Act 2009, No. 25 of 2009 with the name of Guru Ghasidas Vishwavidyalaya.

The motto of the university has taken from Uttarakanda of Sri Ramchritmanas after Doha number 118 (B).
चौपाई:- 
ग्यान पंथ कृपान कै धारा। परत खगेस होइ नहिं बारा॥जो निर्बिघ्न पंथ निर्बहई। सो कैवल्य परम पद लहई॥1॥

भावार्थ:-
ज्ञान का मार्ग कृपाण (दोधारी तलवार) की धार के समान है। हे पक्षीराज! इस मार्ग से गिरते देर नहीं लगती। जो इस मार्ग को निर्विघ्न निबाह ले जाता है, वही कैवल्य (मोक्ष) रूप परमपद को प्राप्त करता है॥1॥

Campus
The Arpa (river), Chhattisgarh Arpa river runs parallel to the university campus.

Residential student halls
GGV is a non-residential  institution. There are four hostels at GGV, three for boys, namely Dr. B.R. Ambedkar Hostel, Swami Vivekananda Hostel and Saheed Veer Narayan Hostel and one for girls. Hostels have facilities as vegetarian mess, gymnasium, play grounds, reading room, TV room etc. There is Internet Facility in Hostels, availed by MHRD. They have a good academic environment for students. Faculty members of university act as wardens for supervision of them.

Organisation and administration
The university is structured into the following academic divisions:

Anthropology & Tribal Development
Biotechnology
Botany
Chemistry
Commerce
Computer Science & IT
Economics
Education
English
Forensic Science
Forestry, Wild Life & Environment Sc.
Hindi
History
Institute of Technology
Journalism & Mass Communication
Law
Library & Information Science
Management
Pharmacy
Physical Education
Pure & Applied Mathematics
Pure & Applied Physics
Political Sc. & Public Administration
Rural Technology
Social Work
Zoology

School of Studies in Engineering and Technology

Institute of Technology, Guru Ghasidas University (IT-GGV) is a Constituent institution of Guru Ghasidas University. It was established in 1997. Currently, institute offers Bachelor of Technology, Master of Technology and Ph.D in various engineering disciplines. Admissions to B.Tech. is done on the basis of merit obtained by the candidate in JEE-main.

Department of Law 
The Department of Law offers two five-year integrated BA LLB and B.Com. LLB. It was established in 2012. Students are admitted through the VET (Vishwavidhyalaya entrance test). The Department of Law is located inside the University teaching department) campus.

National Centre for Accelerator Based Research
GGV is going to establish a 3.0 MV pelletron accelerator(9SDH-4, NEC). This is accordance with the Memorandum of Understanding (MoU) signed between Board of Research in Nuclear Science, Department of Atomic Energy, Government of India and the University, which is for setting a Special Scientific Centre in the campus with the name "National Centre for Accelerator-based Research"(in short NCAR). This inter-disciplinary research facility is related to atomic energy, it would help to create skilled manpower required for nuclear plants. NCAR will be the first of its kind in entire Central India. The machine have already reached from National Electrostatics Corporation, United States. The process of developing necessary infrastructure is going on. NCAR organized two days national workshop on
particle accelerator under the aegis of Indian Society of Particle Accelerator(ISPA) on February 18–19, 2014.

Academic profile

Ranking

Guru Ghasidas University was ranked 44 in the pharmacy ranking in India by National Institutional Ranking Framework (NIRF) in 2020.

Library

The Central Library of Guru Ghasidas Vishwavidyalaya comprises more than 105,000 books, 3,950 back volumes of journals and 1,100 Ph.D. theses. This library has a well Wi-Fi system along with a sufficient number computers for free access. Along with Central library, departments of GGV have their separate Departmental libraries. The library has been recently named as Nalanda Central Library.

See also

Institute of Technology, Guru Ghasidas University

References

External links
 www.ggu.ac.in

Universities in Chhattisgarh
Central universities in India
Education in Bilaspur, Chhattisgarh
Educational institutions established in 1983
1983 establishments in Madhya Pradesh